Norwich City is an English professional football club.

Norwich City may also refer to:

 Norwich, the city in Norfolk, England
 Norwich City, an English former railway station
 Norwich City Council, the local authority for the city of Norwich, England
 Norwich City L.F.C., an English women's football club
 Norwich City Saxons, an English rugby league team
 SS Norwich City, a British merchant ship built in 1911

See also
 Norwich (disambiguation)